Hrithik Roshan is an Indian actor.  Having appeared as a child actor in several films throughout the 1980s, Roshan made his film debut In leading role in Kaho Naa... Pyaar Hai in 2000. His performance in the film earned him the Best Actor and Best Male Debut awards at Filmfare. He followed it with leading roles in Fiza and Mission Kashmir (both released in 2000) and a supporting part in the blockbuster family melodrama Kabhi Khushi Kabhie Gham... (2001).

Following through with several unnoticed performances from 2002 to 2003, he starred in the blockbusters Koi... Mil Gaya (2003) and its sequel Krrish (2006), both of which won him numerous Best Actor awards. Roshan received his third Filmfare Award for Best Actor for his performance in the action film Dhoom 2 (2006), and his fourth for Jodhaa Akbar (2008) for which he was also awarded at the Golden Minbar International Film Festival. He later received further acclaim for his work in Guzaarish (2010), Zindagi Na Milegi Dobara (2011) and Agneepath (2012) and Krrish 3 (2013), his biggest commercial success so far. He thus established himself as a leading contemporary actor of Indian cinema.

Filmfare Awards

International Indian Film Academy Awards

Screen Awards

Zee Cine Awards
 2001: Best Male Debut for Kaho Naa... Pyaar Hai
 2001: Best Actor – Male for Kaho Naa... Pyaar Hai
 2004: Best Actor – Male for Koi... Mil Gaya
 2004: Best Actor – Male (Critics) for Koi... Mil Gaya
 2007: Best Actor – Male for Krrish
 2011: Best Actor – Male (Critics) for Guzaarish
 2020: Best Actor – Male for Super 30
Nominations
 2017: Best Actor – Male for Kaabil

Bollywood Movie Awards
 2001: Best Male Debut for Kaho Naa... Pyaar Hai
 2001: Best Actor for Kaho Naa... Pyaar Hai
 2002: Best Supporting Actor for Kabhi Khushi Kabhie Gham
 2004: Best Actor (Critics) for Koi... Mil Gaya
 2004: Best Actor for Koi... Mil Gaya
 2007: Best Actor for Dhoom 2Stardust Awards
 2005: Editors' Choice for Best Performance for Lakshya 2009: Star of the Year Award - Male for Jodhaa Akbar 2011: Best Actor - Drama for Guzaarish 2012: Best Actor - Drama for Zindagi Na Milegi Dobara 2013: Best Actor - Drama for AgneepathBengal Film Journalists' Association Awards
 2001: Best Actor for Fiza 2007: Best Actor for KrrishBIG Star Entertainment Awards
 2013: Best Actor in an Action Film for Krrish 3Apsara Film & Television Producers Guild Awards
 2004: Best Actor in a Leading Role for Koi... Mil Gaya 2008: ARY Style Icon Award (after being voted as style icon by Pakistani audiences)
 2009: Best Actor in a Leading Role for Jodhaa Akbar 2011: Cinematic Excellence (Male) for GuzaarishGolden Minbar International Film Festival
 2008: Golden Minbar International Film Festival for Muslim Cinema (Kazan, Russia) - Best Actor for Jodhaa AkbarOther film awards
 2000: Sansui Awards, Best Debut for Kaho Naa... Pyaar Hai 2001: Aashirwaad Awards, Best Actor for Kaho Naa... Pyaar Hai 2001: Kalashree Awards, Best Actor for Kaho Naa... Pyaar Hai 2001: Bollywood People's Choice Awards, Best Male Debut for Kaho Naa... Pyaar Hai 2001: Screen Videocon Awards, Best Male Debut for Kaho Naa... Pyaar Hai 2001: Screen Videocon Awards, Best Actor for Kaho Naa... Pyaar Hai 2003: Sansui Awards, Best Actor for Koi... Mil Gaya 2004: Anandlok Awards, Best Male Actor for Koi... Mil Gaya 2004: Asian Guild Awards, Best Actor for Koi... Mil Gaya 2004: Children's Awards, Kamaal Da Actor for Koi... Mil Gaya 2004: FICCI Hall Of Fame Awards, Best Actor for Koi... Mil Gaya 2004: Rupa Filmgoer's Awards, Best Actor for Koi... Mil Gaya 2007: Bollywood People's Choice Awards: Best Actor for Dhoom 2 and Krrish 2007: GIFA Award for Best Actor for Krrish 2007: Anandlok Awards, Best Male Actor for Krrish 2012: Lions Favourite Actor (Critics) - AgneepathNominations
 2011: Mirchi Music Awards for Upcoming Male Vocalist of The Year for "Senorita" from Zindagi Na Milegi DobaraOther awards
 2001: IAS (Indo-American-Society), Young Achievers Award
 2001: NSPCC Awards, Best Young Achiever for Kaho Naa... Pyaar Hai 2004: Chhoton Ka Funda Awards, Chhoton Ka Funda Dhishum Dhishum Doley Sholay Award for swashbuckling muscle and action display for Koi... Mil Gaya 2004: Chhoton Ka Funda Awards, Chhoton Ka Funda Boogie Woogie Award for dance performance in the song "It's Magic" for Koi... Mil Gaya 2004: Sahyog Foundation Award for Koi... Mil Gaya 2004: Pogo Awards, Most Amazing Dancer
 2004: Bollywood Fashion Awards, Celebrity Style Male
 2005: MTV Immies Awards, Best Performance in a Song - Male for "Main Aisa Kyon Hoon" for Lakshya
 2006: Idea Zee F Awards, Youth Style Icon in Films
 2006: Planet-Bollywood People's Choice Awards, Best Actor
 2007: Filmy's Person of the Year 2006
 2007: MTV Lycra Style Awards, Most Stylish Male for Dhoom 2 2007: MTV Lycra Style Awards, Most Stylish Couple along with Aishwarya Rai for Dhoom 2 2007: MTV Lycra Style Awards, Most Stylish Body
 2007: MTV Lycra Style Awards, Most Stylish New Look
 2009: Indian Youth Icon Awards: Indian Youth Icon of the Year for his contribution in the field of entertainment.
 2013: Hello! Magazine Hall of Fame Awards, Entertainer of The Year
 2013: GQ Men of The Year Awards, Cinematic Icon of The Year
 2014: Nickelodeon Kids' Choice Awards India, Best Dancer
 2017: Hall Of Fame Award

Honours and recognitions
 In March 2001, he was ranked 2nd Most Powerful Indian Film Star by Forbes.
 In August 2001, he was honoured with National Citizen's Award for his contribution to Indian Cinema.
 In 2003, he was honoured with the Awadh Samman by the Government of Uttar Pradesh for his outstanding contribution to Indian Cinema.
 In 2004, he was honoured with the Rajiv Gandhi Young Achiever Award.
 In May 2006, he was conferred with the prestigious Sahara'' Awadh Samman in a glittering ceremony during finale at the fortnight-long Lucknow Mahotsav.
 In December 2006, he was honoured during the International Film Festival of India (IFFI) in Panaji for his contributions to mainstream cinema.
 In February 2009, he was among the 10 recipients of the IIFA-FICCI Frames Awards for the "Most Powerful Entertainers of the Decade".
 In 2009 he was credited as a fantastic dancer by Los Angeles newspaper.
 No wonder then that these guys are voted as India's Most Desirable in 2010.
 On 20 January 2011, his life-size wax figure was installed at London's prestigious Madame Tussauds Wax Museum, making him the fifth Indian actor to have been replicated as a wax statue in the museum.
 In 2011, he was voted as the "Sexiest Asian in the World" by the Eastern Eye Weekly.
 In February 2012, he was voted as the "Most Lovable Star".
 On 5 December 2012, Roshan's wax image has been unveiled at Madame Tussauds museum Washington, DC.
 In December 2012, he was crowned for the second year in a row as the "Sexiest Asian Man in the World" by the Eastern Eye Weekly.
 In December 2014, he was voted the world's sexiest Asian man for the third time in four years.
 In January 2018, he was voted the most handsome actor in the world by a website of which majority of traffic comes from India.

See also
 List of accolades received by Zindagi Na Milegi Dobara

References

Lists of awards received by Indian actor